Brittagnathus is an extinct genus of four-limbed vertebrate ("tetrapod") from the Late Devonian of Greenland. It contains a single species, Brittagnathus minutus, which is based on a complete lower jaw recovered from an Acanthostega bonebed in the Britta Dal Formation. It is the fourth named genus of "tetrapod" (more precisely a stem-tetrapod or stegocephalian) from the Late Devonian of Greenland, after Ichthyostega, Acanthostega, and Ymeria.

The jaw is only 4.5 cm (1.8 in.) long, making Brittagnathus the smallest known Devonian "tetrapod". A phylogenetic analysis places it among Carboniferous stegocephalians, particularly the small whatcheeriid Pederpes, rather than the contemporary Devonian stem-tetrapods. This provides support for an origin for Carboniferous-type tetrapods as early as the Devonian.

References 

Stegocephalians
Devonian vertebrates of North America
Devonian Greenland
Fossils of Greenland
Fossil taxa described in 2020
Taxa named by Jenny Clack